Johann Christoph "Jan" Assmann (born 7 July 1938) is a German Egyptologist.

Life and works
Assmann studied Egyptology and classical archaeology in Munich, Heidelberg, Paris, and Göttingen. In 1966–67, he was a fellow of the German Archaeological Institute in Cairo, where he continued as an independent scholar from 1967 to 1971. After completing his habilitation in 1971, he was named a professor of Egyptology at the University of Heidelberg in 1976, where he taught until his retirement in 2003. He was then named an Honorary Professor of Cultural Studies at the University of Constance, where he is today.

In the 1990s, Assmann and his wife Aleida Assmann developed a theory of cultural and communicative memory that has received much international attention. He is also known beyond Egyptology circles for his interpretation of the origins of monotheism, which he considers as a break from earlier cosmotheism, first with Atenism and later with the Exodus from Egypt of the Israelites.

Writings on Egyptian and other religions
Assmann suggests that the ancient Egyptian religion had a more significant influence on Judaism than is generally acknowledged. He used the term "normative inversion" to suggest that some aspects of Judaism were formulated in direct reaction to Egyptian practices and theology. He ascribed the principle of normative inversion to a principle established by Manetho which was used by Maimonides in his references to the Sabians. His book The Price of Monotheism received some criticism for his notion of The Mosaic Distinction. He too no longer holds this theory, at least not in its original form (specifically, the mosaic aspect).

Awards
 1996 Max Planck Award for Research
 1998 German Historians’ Prize
 1998 Honorary Doctorate in Theology from the Theology Faculty, Munster
 2004 Soc.Sc.D. (honoris causa), Yale University
 2005 Ph.D. (honoris causa), Hebrew University of Jerusalem
 2006 Order of Merit of the Federal Republic of Germany, First Class
 2006 Alfried Krupp Prize for Scholarship 
 2011 Großer Literaturpreis der Bayerischen Akademie der Schönen Künste
 2016 Sigmund Freud Prize
 2017 Balzan Prize for Collective Memory together with his wife Aleida Assmann
 2018 Peace Prize of the German Book Trade together with his wife Aleida Assmann
 2020 Pour le Mérite for Sciences and Arts together with his wife Aleida Assmann

Publications
 Re und Amun: Die Krise des polytheistischen Weltbilds im Ägypten der 18.-20. Dynastie (Orbis Biblicus et Orientalis 51). Fribourg and Göttingen 1983.
 Ägypten: Theologie und Frömmigkeit einer frühen Hochkultur (Urban-Bücherei, vol.366, Stuttgart 1984).
 The Search for God in Ancient Egypt trans. David Lorton (2001) 
 "Maât: l'Égypte pharaonique et l'idée de justice sociale" in: Conférences, essais et leçons du Collège de France. Paris: Julliard, 1989. 
German: Ma`at: Gerechtigkeit und Unsterblichkeit im alten Ägypten. Munich 1990 (Arabic Translation 1996).
 Stein und Zeit: Mensch und Gesellschaft im Alten Ägypten. Munich 1991.
 Das kulturelle Gedächtnis: Schrift, Erinnerung und politische Identität in frühen Hochkulturen. Munich 1992.  ASIN B001C84TR4
 trans.: Cultural Memory and Early Civilization: Writing, Remembrance, and Political Imagination. Cambridge University Press, 2011.  , 
 Monotheismus und Kosmotheismus (1993) 
 Egyptian Solar Religion (Studies in Egyptology) (1995) 
 Ägypten: Eine Sinngeschichte (Munich: Hanser 1996; Frankfurt: Fischer, 1999); trans. The Mind of Egypt: History and Meaning in the Time of the Pharaohs (New York : Metropolitan Books, 2002; Harvard University Press, 2003).
 Moses der Ägypter: Entzifferung einer Gedächtnisspur. Munich 1998.
 Moses the Egyptian: The Memory of Egypt in Western Monotheism (Cambridge, Mass.: Harvard University Press, 1997; 1998) 
 Weisheit und Mysterium: Das Bild der Griechen von Ägypten. Munich 2000. 
 Herrschaft und Heil: Politische Theologie in Altägypten, Israel und Europa. Munich 2000. 
 Religion und kulturelles Gedächtnis: Zehn Studien (Munich: C.H. Beck, 2000). 
 Religion and Cultural Memory: Ten Studies (Cultural Memory in the Present) trans. Rodney Livingstone, SUP (2005) 
 Der Tod als Thema der Kulturtheorie (2000) 
 Tod und Jenseits im Alten Ägypten (Munich 2001). 
 Death and Salvation in Ancient Egypt, trans. David Lorton (2006) 
 Altägyptische Totenliturgien, Bd.1, Totenliturgien in den Sargtexten (2002) 
 Die Mosaische Unterscheidung oder der Preis des Monotheismus. Munich 2003.
 trans.  Robert Savage: The Mosaic Distinction or The Price of Monotheism (SUP, 2009) 
 Ägyptische Geheimnisse (2003) 
 Theologie und Weisheit im alten Ägypten (2005) 
 Die Zauberflöte (2005) 
 Thomas Mann und Ägypten: Mythos und Monotheismus in den Josephsromanen (Munich 2006).
 Monotheismus und die Sprache der Gewalt (2006) 
 Of God and Gods: Egypt, Israel, and the Rise of Monotheism (University of Wisconsin Press, 2008)
From Akhenaten to Moses. Ancient Egypt and religious change (The American University in Cairo Press 2014).
 Exodus: Die Revolution der Alten Welt (Munich 2015) 

Books in English

 Egyptian Solar Religion in the New Kingdom, trans. Anthony Alcock (1994) 
 Moses the Egyptian: The Memory of Egypt in Western Monotheism (Harvard University 1997)
 The Mind of Egypt: History and Meaning in the Time of the Pharaohs, trans. Andrew Jenkins (2003) 
 Of God and Gods: Egypt, Israel, and the Rise of Monotheism (2008) 
 Cultural Memory and Early Civilization: Writing, Remembrance, and Political Imagination (Mũnchen 1992; Cambridge University 2011)
 From Akhenaten to Moses: Ancient Egypt and Religious Change (American University in Cairo 2016)

References

External links

 Short biography at litrix.de, German Literature Online
 
 Professor page at the University of Constance
 Profile at the University of Heidelberg's Institute for Egyptology

1938 births
Living people
German Egyptologists
Officers Crosses of the Order of Merit of the Federal Republic of Germany
German male non-fiction writers
Academic staff of Heidelberg University
Academic staff of the University of Konstanz
German expatriates in France
German expatriates in Egypt